Chris Rowland (born December 19, 1997) is an American football wide receiver for the Philadelphia Stars of the United States Football League (USFL). He played college football for the Tennessee State Tigers. After college, he signed with the Atlanta Falcons as an undrafted free agent in 2020.

High school
Rowland attended Ravenwood High School for high school. Rowland mostly played in the running back position at Ravenwood. After graduating in 2016, Rowland opted to play for Tennessee State.

College career
In the 2019 college football season, Rowland was the only player in Division I to record a touchdown via a kick return, punt return, reception, and rush. He also broke the HBCU record for most receptions in a single season, a record which was previously set by Jerry Rice. For his efforts, he was named first-team all-conference as both a receiver and kick returner and received the Deacon Jones Trophy as the best player at an HBCU.

Professional career

Atlanta Falcons
Rowland signed with the Atlanta Falcons as an undrafted free agent following the 2020 NFL Draft on April 27, 2020. He was waived during final roster cuts on September 5, 2020, and signed to the team's practice squad the next day. He was elevated to the active roster on December 26 and January 2, 2021, for the team's weeks 16 and 17 games against the Kansas City Chiefs and Tampa Bay Buccaneers, and reverted to the practice squad after each game. He signed a reserve/future contract on January 4, 2021.

On August 31, 2021, Rowland was waived by the Falcons.

Tennessee Titans
On November 10, 2021, Rowland was signed to the Tennessee Titans practice squad. He was released on November 23.

Philadelphia Stars
On March 10, 2022, Rowland was drafted by the Philadelphia Stars of the United States Football League. He was transferred to the team's inactive roster on April 22, 2022, with a shoulder injury. He was transferred to the active roster on April 30.

Statistics

Post Season

References

External links
Atlanta Falcons bio

1997 births
Living people
American football wide receivers
Tennessee State Tigers football players
African-American players of American football
Players of American football from Tennessee
Atlanta Falcons players
21st-century African-American sportspeople
Philadelphia Stars (2022) players